Serbia and Montenegro competed at the 2006 Winter Olympics in Turin, Italy. This was the last appearance of a team representing a joint Montenegrin and Serbian state at the Olympic venue.

Alpine skiing 

Jelena Lolović represented Serbia and Montenegro in four of the five disciplines, and had the best finish for the alpine skiing team, 30th in the women's giant slalom.

Note: In the men's combined, run 1 is the downhill, and runs 2 and 3 are the slalom. In the women's combined, run 1 and 2 are the slalom, and run 3 the downhill.

Biathlon 

Milenković finished ahead of just three other competitors in each of his two races in Turin. Biathlon was the third Olympic sport Milenković had participated in, as he had previously competed in cycling and cross-country skiing.

Cross-country skiing 

Neither cross-country skier managed to finish a race; Milenković withdrew in the final two kilometres of the 50 km race, while Kuzeljević withdrew in the first 2.5 kilometres of the women's pursuit.

Distance

Figure skating 

The top finish from any member of the Serbia and Montenegro team in Turin came from Trifun Živanović, who did not advance to the free skate, but ended up 26th overall in the men's event.

Key: CD = Compulsory Dance, FD = Free Dance, FS = Free Skate, OD = Original Dance, SP = Short Program

References

Nations at the 2006 Winter Olympics
2006